Holmgate is a hamlet and nearby housing estate between Clay Cross (where the population can be found) and Ashover, in the district of North East Derbyshire, England.

Transport links

Buses
Clay Cross is served by the Number 51 Stagecoach bus service: Chesterfield – Tupton – Clay Cross – Danesmoor. It runs about every 10 minutes.

Trains
Chesterfield railway station (6 miles) provides frequent services to Alfreton, Derby, Nottingham, Sheffield, Leeds and elsewhere.

Road
The main road through Holmgate is Holmgate Road.

Air
Holmgate is about 45 minutes' drive (road traffic permitting) from East Midlands Airport and 1.5 hours from Birmingham and airports.

Schools
Holmgate Primary School and Nursery
Tupton Hall School

Churches

Holmgate Evangelical Church (a member of the Fellowship of Independent Evangelical Churches) started in 1974 in a community centre; the church grew and moved into its own building in 1981.

External links
Clay Cross Library, Holmgate Road
Clay Cross Parish Council

References

Villages in Derbyshire
North East Derbyshire District